Tímea Babos and Andrea Sestini Hlaváčková were the defending champions, but they chose to compete alongside different partners in Wuhan instead. 

Olga Danilović and Tamara Zidanšek won the title, defeating Irina-Camelia Begu and Raluca Olaru in the final, 7–5, 6–3.

Seeds

Draw

Draw

References
Main Draw

Tashkent Open - Doubles
2018 Tashkent Open